The Australian Pesticides and Veterinary Medicines Authority (APVMA) is the Australian Government statutory agency responsible for the management and regulation of all agricultural and veterinary chemical products in Australia.

History
The  APVMA was established on 15 June 1993 as the National Registration Authority for Agricultural and Veterinary Chemicals, under the Agricultural and Veterinary Chemicals (Administration) Act 1992.

Current responsibilities
Any agricultural or veterinary product that is manufactured, sold, imported, or used in Australia must first be registered by the APVMA. To be registered, the process may include scientific evaluations of the safety and efficacy of the product.

See also
Department of Agriculture and Water Resources

References

Commonwealth Government agencies of Australia
Veterinary organizations
Veterinary medicine in Australia
Pesticide regulation